William Signius Knudsen (March 25, 1879 – April 27, 1948) was a leading Danish-American automotive industry executive and an American general during World War II. His experience and success as a key senior manager in the operations sides of Ford Motor Company and then General Motors led the Franklin Roosevelt administration to commission him directly as a lieutenant general in the US Army to help lead the United States' war materiel production efforts for World War II.

Background
Knudsen was born in Copenhagen, Denmark. His name was originally Signius Wilhelm Poul Knudsen. He immigrated to the United States and arrived in New York in February 1900.

Career
Knudsen was working for the John R. Keim Company of Buffalo, New York, a bicycle and auto parts maker, when the Ford Motor Company bought it in 1911 for its steel-stamping experience and tooling. Knudsen worked for Ford from 1911 to 1921, a decade that saw the formative development of the modern assembly line and true mass production. Working first for the Ford Motor Company and later for General Motors from 1921, Knudsen became an expert on mass production and a skilled manager. Knudsen was president of the Chevrolet Division of General Motors from 1924 to 1937 and was president of General Motors from 1937 to 1940.

In 1940, US President Franklin Roosevelt, at the recommendation of Bernard Baruch, asked Knudsen to come to Washington to help with war production. Knudsen was appointed as Chairman of the Office of Production Management and member of the National Defense Advisory Commission for which he received a salary of $1 per year.

In January 1942, Knudsen received a commission as a lieutenant general in the US Army, the only civilian ever to join the army at such a high initial rank, and appointed as Director of Production, Office of the Under Secretary of War. In that capacity, he worked as a consultant and a troubleshooter for the War Department.

In both positions, Knudsen used his extensive experience in manufacturing and industry respect to facilitate the largest production job in history. In response to the demand for war materiel, production of machine tools tripled. The total aircraft produced for the US military in 1939 was less than 3,000 planes. By the end of the war, America produced over 300,000 planes of which the Boeing B-29 Superfortress benefitted greatly from Knudsen's direction. Production of both cargo and Navy ships also increased astronomically. Knudsen's influence not only smoothed government procurement procedures but also led companies that had never produced military hardware to enter the market. America outproduced its enemies. As Knudsen said, "We won because we smothered the enemy in an avalanche of production, the like of which he had never seen, nor dreamed possible."

He was appointed Director of the Air Technical Service Command when it was founded in July 1944 at Patterson Field, Ohio. He served in the Army until his resignation on June 1, 1945.

Personal life

Knudsen was featured on the cover of Time magazine's October 7, 1940 issue. He was a member of Epiphany Lutheran Church (Lutheran Church–Missouri Synod) in Detroit and contributed greatly to the synod's projects around the Detroit area, including buildings for Epiphany Lutheran Church, Outer Drive Faith Lutheran Church, and the Evangelical Lutheran Institute for the Deaf. Knudsen's son Semon "Bunkie" Knudsen was also a prominent automobile industry executive.

Honors and awards
Knudsen was awarded the Vermilye Medal by the Franklin Institute in 1941.

He was also appointed a Knight of the Order of the Dannebrog by the Kingdom of Denmark in 1930 and was promoted Grand Cross of the Order of the Dannebrog in 1946.

Knudsen was inducted into the Automotive Hall of Fame in 1968.

His daughter started a scholarship in the name of her parents.

Knudsen was awarded the Distinguished Service Medal in 1944 and again in 1945 for his service in the US Army during World War II. He also received the American Campaign Medal and World War II Victory Medal for his wartime service.

Dates of rank

References

Further reading
 Borth, Christy.  Masters of Mass Production (Bobbs-Merrill Co., 1945). 
 
 Beasley, Norman. Knudsen: a Biography (New York: Whittlesey House, 1947), 
 Herman, Arthur. Freedom's Forge (New York: Random House, 2012). . 
 Knudsen, William S. (Current Biography, 1940:464-466)
 Knudsen, William Signius (American National Biography, 12:843-844)
 Lacey, James. The Washington War: FDR's Inner Circle and the Politics of Power That Won World War II (2019) pp. 213–222.
 William Signius Knudsen (Encyclopedia of American Business History and Biography: The Automobile Industry, 1920-1980. Pages 265-283). .

External links
Time Magazine cover. October 7, 1940

 

1879 births
1948 deaths
Businesspeople from Copenhagen
Businesspeople from Detroit
Military personnel from Detroit
American businesspeople
People in the automobile industry
Ford executives
General Motors former executives
United States Army generals
Danish emigrants to the United States
Grand Crosses of the Order of the Dannebrog
Recipients of the Distinguished Service Medal (US Army)